The State Basketball League Rookie of the Year was an annual State Basketball League (SBL) award given between 1992 and 2003 to the top rookie of the regular season in both the Men's SBL and Women's SBL. The award was discontinued following the 2003 season, with the league introducing the Most Improved Player award in 2004.

Winners

References

Rookie of the Year
Awards established in 1992
Awards disestablished in 2003
Rookie player awards